The Uruguayan Cycling Federation (in Spanish: Federación Ciclista Uruguaya) is the national governing body of cycle racing in Uruguay. It is a member of the UCI and COPACI.

The Uruguayan Cycling Federation organises the Vuelta Ciclista del Uruguay and supports the Rutas de América, the two most important road races in the country.

External links
Official website

Cycle racing organizations
Cy
Cycle racing in Uruguay